Niche may refer to:

Science
Developmental niche, a concept for understanding the cultural context of child development
Ecological niche, a term describing the relational position of an organism's species
Niche differentiation, in ecology, the process by which competing species use the environment differently in a way that helps them to coexist
Niche market, in economics, the process by which competing companies divide the market in a way that helps them to coexist
Niche (protein structural motif)
Stem-cell niche, the necessary cellular environment of a stem cell

Other uses
Bassline (music genre), a type of music related to UK garage also called Niche
Niche (architecture), an exedra or an apse that has been reduced in size
 A cell of a columbarium for a cremation urn
Niche (company), an Internet search and review service
Niche (horse), a British Thoroughbred racehorse
Niche (video game), a 2017 video game
Niche market, a focused, targetable portion (subset) of a market sector
Niche blogging, a blog focused on a niche market
 Niche, a character in the manga Tegami Bachi
Niche (footballer), Bissau-Guinean footballer
Network in Canadian History and Environment, a group of Canadian environmental historians